Opitsvet is a village in Kostinbrod Municipality, Sofia Province, located in western Bulgaria approximately 31 km from the capital city of Sofia and 11 km west of the town of Kostinbrod. The village was first mentioned as Opiçvud and Opiçved in Ottoman registers of 1576. The name may be linked to the adjective from lop ("butterbur") and the common noun tsvet ("blossom").

Honours
Opitsvet Lake in Antarctica is named after the village.

References

Villages in Sofia Province